HAA may refer to:

Haa as a word
 Hå, a municipality in Norway
 Haa District, Bhutan
 Haa, Bhutan, the seat of the district
Hāʼ, Arabic letter ه
 Hän language

Haa as a code or abbreviation
 Haloacetic acid
 HAA, IATA code for Hasvik Airport in Finnmark, Norway
 Healthy Americans Act, a United States Senate bill
 Heavy anti-aircraft
 Human After All, An album by French electronic music duo Daft Punk.
 Human After All (song), the title track
 High Achievement Academy, in Beachwood, Ohio, United States
 High-altitude airship
 Honolulu Academy of Arts
 The TOPS three letter designation of British Rail HAA Merry-go-round coal wagons
 NRC Herzberg Astronomy and Astrophysics Research Centre

See also

 Haas (disambiguation)
 Ha (disambiguation)